The 1988–89 Combined Counties Football League season was the 11th in the history of the Combined Counties Football League, a football competition in England.

The league was won by British Aerospace (Weybridge) for the fourth time, and for the third time in four seasons.

League table

The league was increased from 18 clubs to 19 after one new club joined:
Steyning Town, joining from the Wessex League.

References

External links
 Combined Counties League Official Site

1988-89
1988–89 in English football leagues